Kasahara may refer to:

 Kasahara (surname)
 Kasahara, Gifu, a former town in Gifu Prefecture, Japan 
 Sakai–Kasahara scheme, an encryption system 
 7133 Kasahara, a main-belt asteroid named after Shin Kasahara